CBW may refer to:

 CBW (AM), a radio station (990 AM) in Winnipeg, Manitoba, Canada
 CBW-FM, a radio station (98.3 FM) in Winnipeg, Manitoba, Canada
 Chemical and biological weapons/warfare – see:
 Chemical warfare
 Biological warfare
 Weapons of mass destruction
 Cincinnati Bell Wireless
 Command Block Wrapper – see USB mass storage device class
 Canterbury West railway station